De'Lance Turner (born August 23, 1995) is a professional gridiron football running back for the Ottawa Redblacks of the Canadian Football League (CFL). He played college football at Alcorn State.

Early life and high school
Turner was born and grew up in McLain, Mississippi and attended Perry Central High School in New Augusta, where he played baseball, basketball, and football. Turner rushed for 519 yards
and 7 touchdowns on 70 carries as a senior and was named first-team All-Area and All-District.

College career
Turner began his collegiate career at Copiah–Lincoln Community College and was named MACJC first-team All-State after leading the team with 600 rushing yards as a sophomore. Turner transferred to Alcorn State for his remaining three years of collegiate eligibility. As a senior, Turner rushed for a school-record 1,357 yards, the second-most in the FCS, and 10 touchdowns and earned first-team All-SWAC and third-team AP FCS All-America honors. He finished his collegiate career with 2,121 rushing yards, fifth-highest in school history, and 15 touchdowns.

Professional career

Baltimore Ravens

Turner signed with the Baltimore Ravens as an undrafted free agent on May 4, 2018. He was waived on September 1, 2018 and was signed to the practice squad the next day. Turner was promoted from the practice squad to the active roster on September 12, 2018 after running back Kenneth Dixon was placed on injured reserve. He made his NFL debut on September 13, 2018 against the Cincinnati Bengals, playing on special teams. In Week 4 against the Pittsburgh Steelers, he recorded a four-yard rush and a ten-yard reception. He was placed on injured reserve on October 13, 2018 with a hamstring injury.

Turner was waived during final roster cuts on August 31, 2019 and re-signed to the Ravens practice squad the next day.

Miami Dolphins
On November 5, 2019, the Miami Dolphins signed Turner off of the Baltimore Ravens practice squad. He was waived on May 16, 2020.

Turner visited the New York Jets on August 13, 2020, and had a tryout with them three days later.

Ottawa Redblacks
On September 12, 2021, Turner signed with the Ottawa Redblacks.

References

External links
Miami Dolphins bio
Alcorn State Braves bio

1995 births
Living people
People from Perry County, Mississippi
Players of American football from Mississippi
American football running backs
Copiah-Lincoln Wolfpack football players
Alcorn State Braves football players
Baltimore Ravens players
Miami Dolphins players
Ottawa Redblacks players
African-American players of Canadian football
Canadian football running backs